Eddleston Water is a small river north of Peebles, in the Scottish Borders area of Scotland which joins the River Tweed at Peebles. It is also known locally as "The Cuddy".

Eddleston Water rises near Mount Lothian and passes through Waterheads,  Eddleston, Milkieston, Redscarhead along the route of the A703. It runs passing Dalatho, brown brothers, squeaks and into Peebles where the Tree Bridge crosses it.
 
When the Edinburgh to Peebles railway was built in the middle of the 19th century the river was straightened for much of its course which adversely affected the wildlife  habitat and increased the speed of flow. As a result, the river is liable to flooding.

In August 2009 the University of Dundee was invited to carry out an initial study on how Eddleston Water could be restored to provide a better habitat for wildlife and to reduces the risk of flooding in Dalatho, Dundee, Peebles, brown brothers, squeaks and Eddleston.

See also
Darnhall Mains
List of places in the Scottish Borders
List of places in Scotland
List of rivers of Scotland

References

Rivers of the Scottish Borders
1Eddleston